St. Luke's United Methodist Church, also known as St. Luke's Methodist and as St. Luke's United Methodist, is an historic Richardsonian Romanesque-style church located at 1199 Main Street in Dubuque, Iowa. It was individually listed on the National Register of Historic Places in 1998, and as a contributing property in the Upper Main Street Historic District in 2005.  It is part of the Iowa Conference of the United Methodist Church.

The church has more Tiffany windows than any other church in the state.

According to its NRHP nomination, the building is significant for its history in religion in Dubuque, for its Richardsonian Romanesque (unique in Dubuque), and for its Tiffany glass.

National Register listing
Historic Significance: 	Architecture/Engineering
Architect, builder, or engineer: 	Tiffany Glass and Decorating Co., Kramer, George W.
Architectural Style: 	Romanesque
Area of Significance: 	Art, Architecture
Period of Significance: 	1875-1899
Historic Function: 	Religion
Historic Sub-function: 	Church Related Residence, Religious Structure
Current Function: 	Commerce/Trade, Religion
Current Sub-function: 	Professional, Religious Structure

History

The church can trace its origins back to the founding of the city of Dubuque. Barton Randle, preached the first sermon on Iowa soil on November 6, 1833. First services were held in 1833 in a multipurpose log cabin building in what is now Washington Square. Subsequent buildings were built in 1834 (also in what is now Washington Square), 1839 (across the street), 1853 (on Main Street between 11th and 12th Streets), and the current building at the corner of 12th and Main Streets.

The present church was built in 1896, and the congregation began worshiping in the building in 1897.  The church is noted for their collection of over 100 Tiffany Stained glass windows.  It has been called "one of the five finest Religious Tiffany collections in the world."  The Angel in the window of the Angel among the Lilies is rumored to bear the likeness of the young deceased daughter of the people who had sponsored that particular window. Since 1990, the church has made an effort to restore and preserve these windows.

The pipe organ in the church is also of historic interest.  When the Farand and Votey organ was purchased, two train cars were required to bring the parts to Dubuque.  Because the train could not get across the river, barges than were used to float the parts over so that they could be installed in the church. The organ has about 1,000 pipes. At the time of installation, it was one of the largest organs in the area, however over the years it has been eclipsed by others.  The pipe organ contains 36 ranks or pipes, about 2,200 total and was restored in 1992 by the Fowler Organ Company, Lansing, Mi.

See also
St. Luke's Methodist Church (Monticello, Iowa), NRHP-listed, known also as St. Luke's United Methodist Church, in Jones County

References

External links
St. Luke's Church Website

Churches completed in 1896
Churches on the National Register of Historic Places in Iowa
National Register of Historic Places in Dubuque, Iowa
United Methodist churches in Iowa
Churches in Dubuque, Iowa
Richardsonian Romanesque architecture in Iowa
Individually listed contributing properties to historic districts on the National Register in Iowa